Sono Junction is an unincorporated community located in the town of Hudson, St. Croix County, Wisconsin, United States.

References

Unincorporated communities in St. Croix County, Wisconsin
Unincorporated communities in Wisconsin